The Telecommunications Act 1997 is an act of law in the Commonwealth of Australia.

See also
 Australian law
 Australian Law Reform Commission
 Surveillance Devices Act 2004
 Telecommunications (Interception and Access) Act 1979
 Privacy Act 1988
 Mass surveillance in Australia
 Telecommunications (Interception and Access) Amendment (Data Retention) Act 2015

External links
Telecommunications Act 1997, at ComLaw
Telecommunications Act 1997 (Cth), at BarNet JADE.
Telecommunications Act 1997, at the Australasian Legal Information Institute
Telecommunications Interception & Access Laws, Electronic Frontiers Australia

1997 in Australian law
Acts of the Parliament of Australia
Data laws of Oceania